Glenmore Park is a suburb of Sydney, in the state of New South Wales, Australia.

Glenmore Park is south of Jamisontown and South Penrith with its boundary being the M4 Motorway. The suburbs of Regentville and Mulgoa are located to its west and south, while Orchard Hills runs along its eastern boundary with the Northern Road as its dividing line. Glenmore Park is one of Penrith City's largest and most rapidly developing housing estates. Its development has been carefully planned to cater for the social, economic and recreational needs of its residents.

History

European settlement
Following the arrival of British settlers, the colonial government granted land in the area to  one of New South Wales' leading private citizens, Sir John Jamison (1776–1844), who arrived in Sydney in 1814. Sir John acquired further parcels of land adjoining his original property, thus establishing a magnificent agricultural estate which he called Regentville. In 1824, Sir John constructed a lavish mansion on the Regentville estate. Sadly, however, the mansion burned down in the 1860s due to arson.

Aboriginal culture
Prior to European settlement, what is now Glenmore Park was home to the Mulgoa people who spoke the Darug language. They lived a hunter-gatherer lifestyle governed by traditional laws, which had their origins in the Dreamtime. Their homes were bark huts called 'gunyahs'. They hunted kangaroos and emus for meat, and gathered yams, berries and other native plants.

Henry Cox, another prominent local landowner, (the son of William Cox) also built a residence in the area. He called it Glenmore. Built in 1825, Cox's residence has since lent its name to the modern locality.

The area's land stayed largely rural until the 1970s, when the first residential sub-divisions commenced. Initially, the locality was known as "Peachtree" but Penrith Council later adopted the more historical-sounding Glenmore Park.

Transport
Glenmore Parkway is the main road in the suburb. It connects with the Northern Road which in turn provides connection with both Penrith and the M4 Western Motorway. The M4 provides quick connection to greater Sydney and the Blue Mountains. Busways provides three bus services in the area which connect Glenmore Park with Penrith. The 797 bus travels via Mulgoa Road and Floribunda Avenue, before arriving at Glenmore Park Shops and then looping around Surveyors Creek Road and The Lakes Drive, while the 799 bus travels via Mulgoa Road and Alison Drive, before arriving at Glenmore Park Shops, followed by a short trip around Shearwater Drive and Ridgetop Drive to St Andrews Drive, before returning the same way. A 2008 report in the Sydney Morning Herald described the suburb as "designed without consideration of public transport". According to the 2016 census 78.3% of residents travelled to work by car and 10% by public transport.

Education
Glenmore Park has four primary schools, two high schools, and a special needs school.
Primary Schools
Glenmore Park Public School
 Surveyors Creek Public School
Bethany Catholic Primary School
 Regentville Public School
High Schools
 Glenmore Park High School
Caroline Chisholm Catholic Girls High School
Bethany and Caroline Chisholm are owned and managed by the Catholic Education Diocese of Parramatta.

Fernhill School (established in 2017) is a K-12 school for students who have moderate to severe intellectual and physical disabilities.

People

Demographics 
According to the 2016 census of Population, there were 23,004 people in Glenmore Park.
 Aboriginal and Torres Strait Islander people made up 2.4% of the population. 
  76.2% of people were born in Australia. The next most common countries of birth were England 3.5%, India 2.7%, Philippines 1.9%, New Zealand 1.3% and South Africa 0.6%.   
 81.8% of people only spoke English at home. Other languages spoken at home included Punjabi 1.7%, Arabic 1.2%, Tagalog 1.0%, Hindi 0.9% and Spanish 0.7%. 
 The most common responses for religion were Catholic 34.9%, No Religion 20.4% and Anglican 19.8%.

The residents are primarily young families living in detached houses. The median age of people in the suburb was 32, younger than the national median of 38. 59.0% were couples with children compared to the national average of 45.7%. Of the occupied private dwellings in Glenmore Park, 91.5% were separate houses and 7.6% were semi-detached. Most dwellings were owned with a mortgage (55.0%) rather than owned outright (21.1%) or rented (22.0%). The median household income ($2,213 per week) was substantially higher than the national median ($1,438).

As such, the population is typically local families, many of whom are home-owners or aspiring home-owners. Suburbs like Glenmore Park are often considered part of the mortgage belt of Western Sydney. There are some units and semi-detached houses in the shopping centre area, though the majority are detached with reasonable size house blocks, well kept gardens and abundant mature native trees.

Governance
Local Government

Glenmore Park is located in South Ward of Penrith City Council. At council elections in 2016, the following councillors were elected to represent South Ward: Jim Aitken OAM (Ind), Mark Davies (Lib), Joshua Hoole (Lib), Karen McKeown (ALP), and Kath Presdee (ALP).

State Government

Glenmore Park is located in the electorate of Mulgoa. The current member is Tanya Davies MP (Lib). , she has been the member for Mulgoa.

Federal Government

Glenmore Park is located in the electorate of Lindsay. The current member is Melissa McIntosh (Lib). She was elected in 2019, following the 2019 Federal Election.

Sport

Rugby League
Glenmore Park's rugby league club is the Glenmore Park Brumbies. They play home games at Ched Towns Reserve (Like all other Glenmore Park-based sports clubs), and play in the colours white, maroon and gold. Their logo is based on an old Brisbane Broncos logo.

Football (Soccer) 
Glenmore Park's football club is Glenmore Park FC. They play in purple, yellow and white. They are the largest football club in the Nepean district as administered by the Nepean Football Association.

Cricket
Glenmore Park's cricket club is the Glenmore Park Cricket Club. They play in black pants and a silver shirt.

Netball
Glenmore Park’s Netball club is the Glenmore Park Netball Club. They play in green, blue. They play in the Penrith District Netball Association.

References

City of Penrith